Jules Lasalle (born April 1, 1957, Saint-Michel-des-Saints, Quebec, Canada) is a sculptor living and working in Montreal. He has made many commemorative monuments that can be seen in Montreal, Longueuil, Quebec city, and other places...

Works
 
In 2012 the Canadian Pauline Marois unveiled a statue by Lasalle of Idola Saint-Jean, Thérèse Casgrain and Marie-Claire Kirkland. The statue was to celebrate the 50th anniversary of Kirkland being made the first Canadian female minister.
 Monica, erected in 1985 on Promenade du Père-Marquette, in Lachine borough, Montreal.
 Natasha, monumental sculpture in 3 fragments, imitating Easter Island's statues, erected in Lachine in 1986.
 Jackie Robinson, erected in 1987 behind Montreal's Olympic Stadium.
 Joseph-Xavier Perreault's bust, erected in 1987 behind Place du Commerce, Montreal.
 Hommage à Marguerite Bourgeoys, erected in 1988 in Old Montreal, behind the 85, Notre-Dame street.
 Hommage aux femmes qui consacrèrent leur vie à l'instruction et à l'éducation: Marie de l'Incarnation, Quebec city, 1997 
 Monument aux Frères éducateurs: Marcellin Champagnat et Jean-Baptiste de la Salle: L'envol, Quebec city, 2000 
 Maurice Richard's monument, Montreal, 2001 
 Statues pour la Chapelle Notre-Dame du Sacré-Cœur, Montreal, 2002 
 Monument du Chevalier de Lorimier, Montreal.
 Pierres tombales (with Annick Bourgeau) for a campaign on AIDS, Agence Marketel), 2003 
 Deportation, i.e. Great Upheaval (with André Fournelle), Acadia, Grand-Pré National Historic Site of Canada, 2006 
 Robert Bourassa's monument, behind the Parliament of Quebec, 2006.
 Jean Béliveau's statue (with Annick Bourgeau), Colisée Jean-Béliveau, Longueuil, 2007

See also 
 Jacques Cartier Monument (Montreal)

Gallery

References

1957 births
Living people
Sculptors from Quebec
People from Lanaudière